The Farah Garad or the Garad Farah (Full Name: ’Farah Shirshore Habarwa Abdullah Muse Said Saleh Abdi Mohamed Abdirahman bin Isma'il al-Jabarti ) is a Somali clan which is part of the Dhulbahante clan-family, a sub-division of the larger Harti/Darod clan. The Farah Garad are divided into two sub-clans — Yassin Garad and Abdalla Garad.  Abdalla has four clan eponyms, Ahmed Garad, Mohamed Garad Baharsame, Guled Garad Barkad and Ali Garad.They are largely significant in Sool and Togdheer regions of Somaliland.

Garad Jama Garad Ali is concurrently the Garad of Farah Garad and the supreme Garad of Dhulbahante, however the largest constituency of clan-head is held by Garad Abdirizak Garaad Soofe, who is the grand garad of the Cali Gheri and Ahmed Garad

Overview
The largest of the farah Garad sub-clans, are Ararsame (mainly Reer Hagar but also Wa'ays Adan and maybe other dia-paying groups) and the Bah Ali Gheri confederation including Farah Adan, Arale Mahad and Odola. Whereas Ararsame is named after an ancient twin duo.Reer Khayr is named after the Dervish period wadaad fraternity which included several Dhulbahante subclans. The Odala and Egal Naleye, sometimes collectively named after their uterine lineage Bahgeri, are intermittently categorized under either Ararsame or Bah Cali Gheri Khayr'.

Distribution

The primarily homeland of the clan straddles the Nugaal Valley and the Ciid segments of the Haud plateaus where they inhabit the Sool and Togdheer regions of Somaliland. In particular, they settle in the districts of Las Anod and Buuhoodle. In Ethiopia, the clan has a significant presence in the Dollo Zone, specifically in the woredas of Boh, Danot and Werder.

Garadate seat
Garadate
Groups
Dharbash, was a Dervish administrative division which was one third Baharsame, a Farah Garad clan.

People

Cabbaas Xuseen, first prime minister of the Dervish (1895 - 1900); of the Baharsame clan
Xaashi Suni Fooyaan, peace-time prime minister of the Dervish (1905-1906); of the Baharsame clan
Soofe-cali Buraale, member of the Dervish haroun, i.e. the government; was of the Baharsame clan
Cabbane Sugulle, commander of Burcadde-Godwein, a Dervish administrative division

Chief caaqil groups
Barkad
People
There were many notable Barkad people in the Dervish haroun, i.e. its government. These include:
Jaamac Ismaaciil Dhoon, was a member of the Dervish haroun; of the Barkad clan
Xareed Duubi Deero, was a member of the Dervish haroun; of the Barkad clan
 Samatar Bullalleh, mentioned in the Geoffrey Archer's 1916 important members of Dervish haroun list

Ararsame twins
People
Cali Meggar, mentioned in the Geoffrey Archer's 1916 important members of Dervish haroun list

Ali Gheri

The Ali-Gheri garad is whom Bah Ali Gheri caaqils (chieftains) of Farah Garad give deference to, by extension making them a confedaration. The poem by Ali Dhuh confirms that the Reer Khayre subclan is a Dhulbahante confederation that consists of Ali Geri, Mahad Adan and Farah Adan, with Dhuh referring to it as a grouping in his poem Allahu Akbar. The Bah Ali Gheri onelings have the largest deegaan (traditional clan territory) of the Farah Garad clans, stretching some 200 kilometers, from Dhilaalo in the north to Dannood in the south. According to both colonial sources as well as native historians such as Jama Omar Issa, the Ali Gheri onelings were the clan whom began and started the early camp of Maxkamadaha Dervishta in 1895.

The Ali Gheri clan are particularly known for being the first tribe to adopt the Dervish (Dervish) identity, and according to professor Ingiriis, the bulk of the Dervish ranks being of the Ali Geri clan, suggested Dervish ideology moved towards "clan solidarity".

Groups
In the following Dervish administrative divisions, at least half comprised Bah Ali Gheri muqaddims (arbitrators), scouts, clerics, tenders and fighters:

Ragxun, was a Dervish administrative division which was half Farah Garad, as Bah Cali Geri is a Farah Garad subclan.
Miinanle, was a Dervish administrative division which was majority Farah Garad, as Cali-geri and Odala & Egal-Naleye are Farah Garad sub-clans.
Golaweyne, was a Dervish administrative division which was half Farah Garad, as Cali-geri are Farah Garad sub-clans.

People
Jaamac Cudur, commander of a Garbo Dervish subdivision
Osman Boss, commander of a Ragxun subdivision
Aadan Dhacdhaco, was a member of the Dervish haroun, i.e. government; was of the Reer Khair Dhulbahante clan
Cabdi Yaar Guuleed, was a member of the Dervish haroun, i.e. government; was of the Reer Khair Dhulbahante clan
Maxamuud Cilmi, was a member of the Dervish haroun, i.e. government; was of the Reer Khair Dhulbahante clan
Aadan Cawad, was a member of the Dervish haroun, i.e. government; was of the Reer Khair Dhulbahante clan
Soofe Durraan, was a member of the Dervish haroun, i.e. government; was of the Reer Khair Dhulbahante clan
Mohamud Hosh, was a member of the Dervish haroun, i.e. government; was of the Reer Khair Dhulbahante clan
Saliid Baynax, member of Dervish haroun

Clan tree
There is no clear agreement on the clan and sub-clan structures and some lineages might be omitted." However, the following summarised clan tree presented below is taken from John Hunt's A general survey of the Somaliland Protectorate (1944-1950)'':

Abdirahman bin Isma'il al-Jabarti (Darod)
 Mohamed Abdirahman (Kabalalah)
 Abdi Mohamed (Kombe)
Salah Abdi (Harti)
Said Abdi (Dhulbahante)
Muse Said
Abdale Muse
Habarwa Abdale
Shirshore Habarwa
Farah 'Garaad' Shirshore
Yasin 'Garad' Farah
Abdulleh Garad Farah
Ali 'Garad' Abdulle
Mohamed 'Garad' Abdulle (Bah'ararsame)
Mohamoud 'Garad' Mohamed (Jabane)
Mohamed Mohamoud
Warsame Mohamoud
Liban Mohamoud 
Sharmarke Mohamoud
Audon Mohamoud
Warfa Mohamoud
Hersi Mohamoud
Farah Mohamoud
Ali Mohamoud
Adur Ali
Samakab Ali (Adde)
Samatar Ali
Omar Ali
Mohamoud Ali
Samatar Mohamoud
Farah Mohamoud
Mohamed Mohamoud
Mohamoud Mohamed
Ali Mohamoud (Bihi Idoor)
Beder Mohamoud (Bihi Idoor)
Yusuf Mohamoud (Bihi Idoor)
Hersi Mohamoud (Bah Ogaden)
Esa Mohamoud (Bah Ogaden)
Nur Mohamoud (Bah Majerteen)
Naleya Mohamoud (Bah Majerteen)
Ali (Hamud) Naleya
Magan Naleya
Mohamoud Naleya
Hussein Naleya
Salah Naleya
Adan Naleya 
Guleed 'Garaad' Abdulleh (Barkad)
Ali Gulled
Amir Gulled
Mohamoud Gulled
Egal Mohamoud
Esa Mohamoud
Wegel Mohamoud
Ali Mohamoud
Koshin Ali
Gedi Ali
Naleya Ali
Shirwa Naleya
Musa Shirwa
Suban Shirwa
Beeda Shirwa
Ali Shirwa
Farah Ali (Baha'Ali)
Mohamed Ali (Baha'Ali)
Yusuf Ali (Baha'Ali)
Maah Ali (Baha'Ali)
Diriye Ali (Baha'Ali)
Hersi Ali
Gulled Ali
Ahmed 'Garaad' Abdulleh
Samakab Ahmed (Odala)
Egal Ahmed (Bahgeri)
Warfa Ahmed (Bahgeri)
Hassan Ahmed (Bahgeri)
Naleye Ahmed (Egal Naleya)
Ali'Geri Ahmed (Reer Khayr),
Ismail Ali’Geri
Hersi Ali’Geri
Shawe Ali’Geri
Burale Ali’Geri
Gulled Ali’Geri
Warfa Ali'Geri
Aralle Warfa
Mohamed Warfa
Jama Warfa
Naleya Warfa
Subaan Ali’Geri
Beder Suban
Beyle Suban
Ali Suban
Khayr Suban
Hildid Khayr
Raage Khayr
Egal Khayr
Sharmarke Khayr
Farah Khayr
Duale Khayr
Adan Ahmed
Mahad Adan (Reer Khayr)
Aralle Mahad
Farah Adan (Reer Khayr)
Wa'eys Adan (Ararsame)
Warfa Wa'eys
Hildid Wa'eys
Shirwa Wa'eys
Erbad Wa'eys
Dulul Wa'eys
Nur Dulul
Gulled Wa'eys
Mah Gulled
Adan Gulled
Naleya Wa'eys
Jama Naleya
Sharmarke Naleya
Beder Naleya
Hagar Adan (Ararsame)
Gedi Hagar (Bah Ogaden)
Addaad Hagar (Bah Ogaden)
Warsame Hagar (Bah Ogaden)
Elmi Hagar (Bah Ogaden)
Amir Hagar (Bah Ogaden)
Gulled Hagar (Bah Ogaden)
Ayaar Hagar (Bah Warsengali)
Fatah Hagar (Bah Warsengali)
Adan Hagar (Bah Warsengali)
Jama Adan (Reer Tuudhe)
Ahmed Adan 
Abdulle Adan
Ali Adan
Qolaab Ali
Awale Ali
Warsame Ali
Farah Adan
Siad Farah (Bah Abrahin)
Duale Farah (Bah Abrahin)
Hersi Farah (Bah Abrahin)
Warsame Farah (Bah Abrahin)
Hagar Farah (Bah Abrahin)
Ismail Farah (Bah Habar Eli)
Seed Farah (Bah Habar Eli)
Boos Farah (Bah Habar Eli)
Omar Farah (Bah Habar Eli)
Deria Farah (Bah Habar Eli)
Shire Farah (Bah Hawiye)
Hussein Farah (Bah Hawiye)
Elmi Farah (Bah Hawiye)
Farah Hagar (Bah Warsengali)
Olloh Farah
Haad Farah
Egal Farah
Jama Egal (Bah Hawiye)
Mohamoud Egal (Bah Hawiye)
Ismail Egal (Bah Hawiye)
Hersi Egal (Bah Ugaadh)
Aralle Egal (Bah Ugaadh)
Ahmed Egal (Bah Ugaadh)
Naleya Egal (Bah Ugaadh)
Mohamed Egal (Bah Ugaadh)

Notes

Notable Figures

Prime ministers
Ali Khalif Galaydh, Ex-Prime minister of Somalia and Khaatumo President.
Cabbaas Xuseen, first prime minister of the Dervish (1895 - 1900)
Xaashi Suni Fooyaan, peace-time prime minister of the Dervish (1905-1906)

Leaders
Mohamed Yusuf Jama, former Khaatumo president
Saleban Essa Ahmed, SSC Leader and former Somaliland Minister of Health
Abdihakim Abdullahi Haji Omar, Former Vice President of Puntland.
Ismail Mire, Shiikhyaale commander, poet.
Barni Sugulle, female governor of Indhabadan, sister of Faarax Sugulle
Jaamac Ismaaciil Dhoon, Barkad, Dervish muqaddim

Commanders
Suleiman Aden Galaydh, Dervish commander at Cagaarweyne
Xayd Aden Galaydh, Dervish commander at Jidbali

Tribal leaders
Garad Jama Garad Ali, Traditional Clan Chief of the Dhulbahante Clan.

 Garaad Abdulahi Garaad Soofe, Garad, of the Ahmed Garad, the second most senior chief of the Farah Garad branch of the Dhulbahante Clan.

Enterprisers
Abdinasir Ali Hassan, Chairman of Hass Petroleum.
Abdi Holland, Somali artist. 
Ali Dhuh, a great poet a coiner of new Somali words; poetic critic of the Sayid
Aadan Carab, poet who chronicled colonial-era events; said a Dhulbahante genocide occurred at the hands of European colonialists

Legislative speakers
Bashe Mohamed Farah, Former Speaker of Somaliland House of Representatives.
Faarax Sugulle, head of the Dervish haroun

Politicians
Ali Jangali, Former Somali minister of foreign affairs.
 Ahmed Aidid former Minister of Education.
Abdiqani Mohamoud Jidhe, Governor of Sool.
Abokor Seed Cali, member of the Dervish haroun, of the Odala Samakab (Bahgeri Dhulbahante) clan

References

Dhulbahante
Somali clans in Ethiopia